Phylloporus hyperion is a species of fungus in the family Boletaceae.

External links
Index Fungorum

hyperion